The Athabasca Sand Dunes Provincial Park was created to protect the Athabasca sand dunes, a unique boreal shield ecosystem located in the far-north Northern Saskatchewan Administration District. The Athabasca sand dunes are the most northerly active sand dune formations on Earth.

It first came to attention that it should be a protected area in 1969, finally becoming the Athabasca Sand Dunes Provincial Wilderness Park on August 24, 1992.

The park extends for 100 kilometres along the southern edge of Lake Athabasca and lies within the Athabasca Basin of the Canadian Shield. The sand dunes are 400 to 1,500 metres long, and their maximum height is approximately 30 metres. The park is accessible by float plane or boat only.

The William River flows through the western section of the park ending in a large river delta. The McFarlane River flows through the far eastern section of the park. The park goes around the Fond du Lac 231 (First Nations Reserve) located on the McFarlane River. The First Nations village of Fond du Lac is located 44 km (27 miles) by air from the park's eastern boundary.

Geology 
The Athabasca sand dunes are estimated to be approximately 8,000 years old, formed near the end of the last glacial period. As glaciers receded, meltwater washed enormous quantities of sand, silt and sediment from local sandstone into Lake Athabasca, whose water level was at the time much higher than currently. As the lake level declined to its modern depth, the large sand deposits were revealed. The sand dunes are quite unstable, being constantly shifted by winds, which  push the dunes at the edges of the area into the surrounding forest. Evidence also suggests that fires have greatly influenced the winds shaping the dunes. Unlike the dunes closer to the lake, the southern dunes are in fact quite stable relative to other areas in the region.

Geological features that can be found in the region include eskers and beach ridges. In addition, portions of the Williams River in the region flow through braided channels in the sand. Some of the dune field is covered with desert pavement.

The dunes are generally parabolic in shape. The sand almost completely covers the underlying sandstone deposits; the bedrock is around 20 metres below ground on average. The entire sandy region, including areas south of the dunes, serves as an enormous aquifer, which as a result significantly affects plant life and dune development.

Endemic flora 
This area is home to rare and endemic plant species not found anywhere else. Some of the plants which may be found in this area are felt-leaved willow (Salix silicicola), Mackenzie hairgrass (Deschampsia mackenzieana), Tyrrell's willow (Salix planifolia tyrrellii), and floccose tansy (Tanacetum huronense var. floccosum).

Maps

 Mouth of the William River 
 Mouth of the McFarlane River 
 Map

See also 
List of protected areas of Saskatchewan
Tourism in Saskatchewan

References

External links 
 

Provincial parks of Saskatchewan
Division No. 18, Saskatchewan
Dunes of Canada
Lake Athabasca
Protected areas established in 1992
1992 establishments in Saskatchewan
Northern Saskatchewan Administration District